Gamal is an Arabic surname and male given name. Notable people with this name إبراهيم ابومياله:

Surname
 Amr Gamal, (born 1991) Egyptian footballer
 Mazen Gamal (born 1986), Egyptian squash player
Raghda Gamal, Yemeni journalist and poet

Given name
 Gamal Aziz, Egyptian former business executive, indicted as part of the 2019 college admissions bribery scandal
 Gamal Mubarak (born 1963), son of former Egyptian President Hosni Mubarak
 Gamal Abdel Nasser (1918–1970), Egyptian president
 Gamal Salama (1945–2021), Egyptian songwriter
 Gamal Salem (1918–1968), Egyptian military officer

See also
 Sharif El-Gamal (born 1973), New York City real estate developer
 Taher Elgamal (born 1955), Egyptian cryptographer
 Jamal
 Jamaal

Arabic masculine given names